Luděk Štyks (born 30 June 1961) is a Czech former cyclist. He competed in the road race at the 1988 Summer Olympics.

References

External links
 

1961 births
Living people
Czech male cyclists
Olympic cyclists of Czechoslovakia
Cyclists at the 1988 Summer Olympics
People from Litoměřice
Sportspeople from the Ústí nad Labem Region